Rugby league was introduced to Catalonia following the addition of the Perpignan-based Catalans Dragons to the professional Super League in 2006. An amateur rugby league competition was formed in 2008 and ran for three seasons under the administration of the Associació Catalana de Rugby Lliga.

Rugby league in Spain has been administered by the Spanish Rugby League Association since 2013.

History 
Rugby league started in Catalonia in autumn 2007, with the advice of people from the French Catalan region, where this sport has been played since the 1930s. The number of clubs has been growing since 3 clubs participated in the first competition to reach 9 teams in the first Catalonia Championships in April 2009.

The Catalan representative side made their debut in January 2008, when they participated in the French Interleague Championship held near Perpignan, in France.

Governing body

The governing body for rugby league in Catalonia was the Associació Catalana de Rugby Lliga, being an unranked member of the Rugby League European Federation with Official observer status since 2008.

Competitions

The first Catalan competition, the Catalonia Cup, took place in April 2008 with 3 teams: FC Barcelona, Aligots de Girona and Nord-Català. The winners were FC Barcelona. The results from the competition were:
 FC Barcelona 22-20 Aligots Girona
 Aligots Girona 24-0 Nord-Català
 Nord-Català 4-24 FC Barcelona

In February 2009 the first Catalan university rugby league championship took place, with seven universities teams participating: Perpinyà, Ramon Llull, Girona, Autònoma de Barcelona, Vic, Politècnica de Catalunya and Pompeu Fabra. Universitat de Perpinyà were the winners.

In Spring 2009 was played the first Catalan Rugby League Championship, with nine teams in competition: Barcelona Universitari Club, Club de Rugby Sant Cugat, CE INEF Lleida, GEIEG, Club Natació Poble Nou - Enginyers, Club de Rugby Tarragona, Garrotxa Rugbi Club, Club Atlètic Vic - Crancs and Club Rugby Valls. Barcelona Universitari Club were the champions.

National team

The Catalonia national rugby league team played their first full international losing to Morocco in a game played prior to the Catalans Dragons vs Warrington Wolves Super League, on June 21, 2008.

In June 2009, Catalonia beat the Czech Republic in a match played prior to the Catalans Dragons vs Warrington Wolves Super League game, this time played in Barcelona. This match was an international warm-up ahead of the Euro Med Challenge contested by Catalonia, Morocco and Belgium. They lost 6-29 at home to Morocco and 28-22 at Belgium.

See also
Sport in Catalonia
Sport in Spain
Rugby league in Spain

References

External links
 Catalan Association Rugby League